Arkadiusz Klimek (born March 25, 1975) is a Polish former professional footballer.

Career
Klimek started his career with local side Jeziorak Iława before moving to Stomil Olsztyn in 1995 then Zagłębie Lubin three years later. After 6 seasons with Zagłębie he decided to try his luck abroad, moving to Greece in 2003 with Panionios Nea Smirna. He returned after a single season, joining Wisła Płock in 2004.

In 2005 Klimek left Poland for a second time, joining Lithuanian champions FBK Kaunas. He helped Kaunas win the Cup in his debut season, although they finished runners-up to Ekranas Panevėžys in the A Lyga. The following season his 8 league goals helped Kaunas regain the league title and also earned him a move to Scotland, where he joined Scottish Premier League club Heart of Midlothian on a 6-month loan deal in January 2007. He made his Hearts debut in a 1-0 defeat of Inverness Caledonian Thistle in March 2007 but made only one further start before his loan deal expired.

References

External links
 
 
 Appearances at londonhearts.com

1975 births
Living people
People from Iława
Sportspeople from Warmian-Masurian Voivodeship
Association football forwards
Polish footballers
Jeziorak Iława players
Zagłębie Lubin players
Panionios F.C. players
Wisła Płock players
FBK Kaunas footballers
Heart of Midlothian F.C. players
FK Liepājas Metalurgs players
Polish expatriate footballers
Scottish Premier League players
Expatriate footballers in Scotland
Polish expatriate sportspeople in Scotland
Expatriate footballers in Greece
Polish expatriate sportspeople in Greece
Expatriate footballers in Lithuania
Polish expatriate sportspeople in Lithuania